Khatikyana is a village in Jhansi district of Uttar Pradesh state. Popular in India for Khatikyane ki Kaali Maata. It is just 1.7 kilometers from Jhansi fort and 4.6 kilometers from Jhansi railway junction.

Temples & events 
Khatikyana is famous for Khatikyane Ki Kaali Maata and "The Kaali Visarjan Mahotsav" celebrated by Hindu Khatik people, which organised by "Sri Sri 1008 Mahakali Utsav Samiti, Khatik Samaj" every year on the occasion of Hindu festival Dussehra where lacs of people come across India to watch and celebrate the event.

References 

Villages in Jhansi district